The Toronto Rock are a lacrosse team based in Toronto playing in the National Lacrosse League (NLL). The 2012 season was the 15th in franchise history, and 14th as the Rock.

After the retirement of Bob Watson, the Rock needed to fill the starting goaltender spot for the first time in franchise history. In July, the Rock traded defender Kyle Ross to the Washington Stealth for Matt Roik, a 10-year NLL veteran. The Rock lost their first two games of the season, but then won four of their next five. Roik was named Defensive Player of the Week in week 5 and was also named to the Eastern All-Star team. But the team lost their next three games, including a 21–14 blowout to the Buffalo Bandits, and management felt a change needed to be made. They sent a draft pick to the Calgary Roughnecks for backup goaltender Nick Rose and released Roik.

The Rock won five of their final six regular season games, finishing the season with a 9–7 record, good enough for first in the Eastern division. In the division semi-finals, they once again faced the Bandits, who had beaten the Rock in 2 of their 3 matchups in the regular season. With stellar goaltending performances by both Rose and former Rock goalie Anthony Cosmo, the Rock defeated the Bandits 7–6 to advance to their third straight Eastern final.

The Rock hosted the Rochester Knighthawks, who had a 4–18 all-time record in Toronto and hadn't beaten the Rock in Toronto since 2008. But the Knighthawks scored early and often, and despite being down by only two at the half, the Rock were never able to regain the lead and Rochester advanced to the Championship game by beating the Rock 17–13.

Regular season

Conference standings

Game log
Reference:

Playoffs

Game log
Reference:

Transactions

Trades

Dispersal Draft
The Rock chose the following player in the Boston Blazers dispersal draft:

Entry draft
The 2011 NLL Entry Draft took place on September 21, 2011. The Rock selected the following players:

Roster

See also
2012 NLL season

References

Toronto
2012 in Toronto
2012 in Canadian sports